Neodythemis preussi is a species of dragonfly in the family Libellulidae. It is found in Cameroon, the Democratic Republic of the Congo, Equatorial Guinea, Gabon, Nigeria, Uganda, and Zambia. Its natural habitat is subtropical or tropical moist lowland forests.

References

Libellulidae
Fauna of Central Africa
Insects of West Africa
Insects of Cameroon
Insects of Equatorial Guinea
Insects of Gabon
Insects of the Democratic Republic of the Congo
Insects of Uganda
Insects of Zambia
Least concern biota of Africa
Taxonomy articles created by Polbot
Insects described in 1891